Pennsylvania State Senate District 6 includes parts of Bucks County. It is currently represented by Republican Frank Farry.

District profile
The district includes the following areas:

 Bensalem Township
 Hulmeville
 Ivyland
 Langhorne
 Langhorne Manor
 Lower Southampton Township
 Middletown Township
 Northampton Township
 Penndel
 Upper Southampton Township
 Warminster Township
 Warrington Township
 Warwick Township
 Wrightstown Township

Senators

Recent election results

References

Pennsylvania Senate districts
Government of Bucks County, Pennsylvania